is a railway freight terminal in the city of Fukui, Japan. It is located on the Hokuriku Main Line between Echizen-Hanandō and Fukui Stations. It is operated by Japan Freight Railway Company (JR Freight). The Fukui yard opened in December 140 and the terminal was opened on December 1, 1952.

Surrounding area
Taiheiyo Cement - Fukui Service Station
Sumitomo-Osaka Cement - Minami-Fukui Service Station

See also
 List of railway stations in Japan

References

External links

Fukui (city)
Stations of Japan Freight Railway Company
Railway stations in Japan opened in 1952
Railway stations in Fukui Prefecture